Austria participated in the Eurovision Song Contest 2007 with the song "Get a Life – Get Alive" written by Greg Usek and Austin Howard. The song was performed by Eric Papilaya. In October 2006, the Austrian broadcaster Österreichischer Rundfunk (ORF) announced that they would be returning to the Eurovision Song Contest after a one-year absence following their withdrawal in 2006 due to poor results in the 2005 contest. On 20 February 2007, ORF announced that they had internally selected Eric Papilaya to compete at the 2007 contest in Helsinki, Finland, while "Get a Life – Get Alive" was presented to the public on 7 March 2007.

Austria competed in the semi-final of the Eurovision Song Contest which took place on 10 May 2007. Performing during the show in position 27, "Get a Life – Get Alive" was not announced among the top 10 entries of the semi-final and therefore did not qualify to compete in the final. It was later revealed that Austria placed twenty-seventh out of the 28 participating countries in the semi-final with 4 points.

Background

The Austrian national broadcaster, Österreichischer Rundfunk (ORF), broadcasts the event within Austria and organises the selection process for the nation's entry. Following the 2005 contest, the Austrian broadcaster announced in June 2005 that the country would not participate in 2006 citing poor results in the 2005 contest as the reason for their decision. Following their one-year absence, ORF confirmed their intentions to participate at the 2007 Eurovision Song Contest on 21 October 2006. From 2002 to 2005, ORF had set up national finals with several artists to choose both the song and performer to compete at Eurovision for Austria. For the 2007 Eurovision Song Contest, ORF held an internal selection to choose the artist and song to represent Austria at the contest. This method had last been used by ORF in 2000.

Before Eurovision

Internal selection 
On 20 February 2007, ORF announced that they had internally selected Eric Papilaya to represent Austria in Helsinki. Papilaya participated in the third season of the talent show Starmania where he was a finalist. On 7 March 2007, the song "Get a Life – Get Alive", written by Greg Usek and Austin Howard was presented as the Austrian entry for the contest at an ORF press conference as well as via radio on Ö3. "Get a Life – Get Alive" was also announced as the official 2007 theme song of the AIDS charity event Life Ball, continuing the historical relationship between the Austrian Eurovision entry and the Life Ball event.

Promotion 
Prior to the contest, Eric Papilaya specifically promoted "Get a Life – Get Alive" as the Austrian Eurovision entry during his Get a Life bus tour, which departed from Vienna on 20 April and arrived in Helsinki for the contest on 4 May. The tour covered 15 cities across Europe and included several international television and radio appearances. In addition to his international appearances, Eric Papilaya performed "Get a Life – Get Alive" as a musical guest during the ORF eins programme Dancing With Stars on 20 April, while a farewell concert was held at the Heidenplatz on 20 April before the bus tour.

At Eurovision
According to Eurovision rules, all nations with the exceptions of the host country, the "Big Four" (France, Germany, Spain and the United Kingdom) and the ten highest placed finishers in the 2006 contest are required to qualify from the semi-final on 10 May 2007 in order to compete for the final on 12 May 2007. On 12 March 2007, a special allocation draw was held which determined the running order for the semi-final. As one of the five wildcard countries, Austria chose to perform in position 27, following the entry from Turkey and before the entry from Latvia.

The semi-final and the final were broadcast in Austria on ORF 2 with commentary by Andi Knoll. The Austrian spokesperson, who announced the Austrian votes during the final, was Eva Pölzl.

Semi-final 

Eric Papilaya took part in technical rehearsals on 4 and 6 May, followed by dress rehearsals on 9 and 10 May. The Austrian performance featured Eric Papilaya performing on stage in a silver suit designed by British designer Vivienne Westwood with 2,000 Swarovski crystals attached, with the words "Get Alive" scrolling horizontally and vertically on the LED screens. The performance began with Papilaya coming out from the loop of a 700 meter red feathered AIDS ribbon prop attached with 14,000 Swarovski crystals, of which four dancers/backing vocalists in red skin-tight feathered costumes were on. The performers later came off from the prop to the front of the stage to perform a dance routine accompanied by pyrotechnic effects. In regards to the performance, organiser of the Life Ball event Gery Keszler stated: "With this show we will conquer Europe and put the issue of AIDS in the spotlight but in an optimistic way." Eric Papilaya was also joined on stage by guitarist Thommy Pilat, while the four backing performers were: Cedric Lee Bradley, Jerome Knols, Laura Fernandez and Nina Weiß.

At the end of the show, Austria was not announced among the top 10 entries in the semi-final and therefore failed to qualify to compete in the final. It was later revealed that Austria placed twenty-seventh in the semi-final, receiving a total of 4 points.

Voting 
Below is a breakdown of points awarded to Austria and awarded by Austria in the semi-final and grand final of the contest. The nation awarded its 12 points to Serbia in the semi-final and the final of the contest.

Points awarded to Austria

Points awarded by Austria

References

External links
 Eurovision-Austria.com 

2007
Countries in the Eurovision Song Contest 2007
Eurovision